Bulo is a settlement in Butambala District in the Central Region of Uganda.

Location
The settlement is in Bulo Parish, Bulo Sub-county, being one of the seven parishes in that administrative unit.

The coordinates of Bulo are 0°06'53.0"N, 32°00'05.0"E (Latitude:0.114722; Longitude:32.001389).

Overview
On the morning of 28 January 2020, a UPDF Air Force Bell Jet Ranger helicopter, registration number AF-302, on a training mission, with two crew members, crashed into nearby Ndese Hill, killing both occupants.

The deceased were later identified as Major Naomi Karungi, Commander of the UPDF Bell Jet Ranger Squadron and Cadet Pilot Lieutenant Benon Wakalo, both based at Entebbe Air Force Base.

See also
 Gombe General Hospital

References

External links
 Website of Butambala District Administration

Populated places in Central Region, Uganda
Cities in the Great Rift Valley
Butambala District